Langsua National Park was established in 2011. It is located in the county of Oppland in Norway, and covers parts of the municipalities Øystre Slidre, Nord-Aurdal, Nordre Land, Gausdal, Sør-Fron and Nord-Fron.

References

National parks of Norway
Protected areas established in 2011
Protected areas of Oppland
2011 establishments in Norway
Gausdal
Nord-Aurdal
Nordre Land
Nord-Fron
Sør-Fron